Badr (full name: Badr Hunayn) is a town in Al Madinah Province, Al-Hijaz, Saudi Arabia. It was the location of the Battle of Badr, between the Quraishi-led Polytheists, and the Muslims under the leadership of Muhammad, in 624 CE.

History
Badr is located 130 kilometers southwest of Medina and lies in a harsh natural landscape of desert plains, steep hills and sand dunes.
 
In pre-Islamic times, Badr was part of the night journey from the coast of the Red Sea, along the caravan route from Mecca to Damascus.
 
Badr was once known for its wells. On March 13, 624 (17 Ramadan 2 AH), the Battle of Badr occurred when 313 men encountered outnumbering Meccan forces of the pagan Quraish army. The engagement resulted in a victory for the Muslims under the command of Muhammad, the last prophet of Islam.

Climate

Badr has hot desert climate (Köppen climate classification BWh). with Extremely hot long summers and mild winters. In Winter, nights averaging 10-15 °C (50-59 °F). In Mid-Summers, Temperatures above  are not unusual. Annual rainfall is low, with rain most commonly occurring in November through February.

Battle of Badr

According to Islamic sources, Quraishi leader Abu Jahl said:

"By Allah, we will not go back until we have been to Badr, for we will spend three days there, slaughter camels and feast and drink wine, and the girls shall play for us. The Arabs will hear that we have come and gathered together, and will respect us in future! So come on!"

Akhnas ibn Shariq al-Thaqifi and the Banu Zuhrah were with the Meccan as part of the escort that preceded the battle, but since he believed the caravan to be safe, he did not join Quraish on their way to a festival in Badr. He returned with Banu Zuhrah returned so the two clans present in the battle.

See also

Hunayn, Saudi Arabia
List of cities and towns in Saudi Arabia

References

Populated places in Medina Province (Saudi Arabia)